Perfume the Best: P Cubed (stylized Perfume the Best "P Cubed") is the third compilation album by Japanese girl group Perfume, released through Universal Music Japan on September 18, 2019. It contains 52 tracks spanning the group's career and was released to commemorate the 15th anniversary of their major debut. It contains two new songs that bookend the collection, "Challenger" and "Nananananairo".

The album debuted atop the Oricon Albums Chart and Billboard Japan Hot Albums chart, selling over 97,000 copies and an additional 50,000 units in its first week. It marked Perfume's eighth number-one album, tying them with AKB48 for the most number ones on the Oricon charts for a female group.

Release
The album was made available in a variety of formats, including a standard edition with three discs, a "limited edition" with three discs and either a Blu-ray or DVD, and a "limited press edition", including the three discs, Blu-ray or DVD, and a photobook in a "special package".

Track listing

Charts

Weekly charts

Year-end charts

Certifications

References

2019 compilation albums
Perfume (Japanese band) albums